Jerzy Sever Linderski (born 21 August 1934 in Lwow, Poland, now Lviv) is a contemporary Polish scholar of ancient history and Roman religion and law.

Currently George L. Paddison Professor of Latin Emeritus at the University of North Carolina at Chapel Hill, Jerzy Linderski is one of the foremost classical philologists and Roman historians of the modern era.  He earned his Ph.D. from the University of Kraków in Poland in 1960.  He has served on the faculties of the University of Oregon and the University of North Carolina at Chapel Hill.  His scholarship has concentrated, in particular, on topics of Roman religion and augury, Roman law and Latin epigraphy. His collected papers have appeared in two volumes of "Roman questions".

Bibliography

Books
 Państwo a kolegia ze studiów nad historią rzymskich stowarzyszeń u schyłku republiki. Kraków : Nakładem Universytetu Jagiellońskiego (1961).
 Rzymskie zgromadzenie wyborcze od Sulli do Ceza. Wrocław : Zakład Narodowy im. Ossolińskich ; Wydawn. Polskiej Akademii Nauk (1966).
 Roman Questions: Selected Papers. (Steiner, 1995). . (Reviews: BMCR 97.2.9)
 ed. Imperium sine fine. T. Robert S. Broughton and the Roman Republic. (Stuttgart: Steiner, 1996) X, 234 S., Abb. Taf., ed. Linderski, J., (Historia, Einzelschriften, 105). . (Reviews: BMCR 98.4.10)
 [Festschrift] C.F. Konrad ed. Augusto augurio: Rerum humanarum et divinarum commentationes in honorem Jerzy Linderski. (Steiner, 2004). (Includes papers by former students, including Frances Hickson-Hahn, Timothy J. Moore, Christopher McDonough, Hans-Friedrich Mueller, Matthew Panciera, Michael Johnson, Jonathan Perry, Daniel Gargola, Tadeusz Mazurek, and C.F. Konrad). . (Reviews: BMCR 2005.07.25)
 Roman Questions II: Selected Papers. (Steiner, [October 2007]). . (Reviews: BMCR 2008.09.15)
 Updated edition of Lily Ross Taylor Voting Districts of the Roman Republic, with new and expanded information. University of Michigan Press, 2012. . (Reviews: BMCR 2013.10.47)

Articles
 "Notes on CIL I³ 364". PP 13 (1958) 47-50.
 "Świadectwo Askoniusza o położeniu prawnym kolegiów u schyłku republiki." (Poln.) ['Germ. Ein Zeugnis des Asconius zur Rechtslage der Collegien am Ende der Republik.] Eos 50 (1959–60) 133-141.
 "Zum Namen Competalis." Glotta 39 (1960) 145-149. 
 "Ciceros Rede "Pro Caelio" und die Ambitus- und Vereinsgesetzgebung der ausgehenden Republik." Hermes 89 (1961) 106-119.
 "Two speeches of Q. Hortensius. A contribution to the corpus oratorum of the Roman republic." PP 16 (1961) 304-311.
 "Etruskische Etymologien, zilaθ and purθ." Glotta 40 (1962) 150-159.
 "Suetons Bericht ueber die Vereinsgesetzgebung unter Caesar und Augustus." ZSS-Roem. Abt. 79 (1962) 396-402.
 "Cicero and Sallust on Vargunteius." Historia 12 (1963) 511-512.
 "Alfred the Great and the Tradition of Ancient Geography." Speculum 39 (1964) 434-439.
 "Constitutional Aspects of the consular elections in 59 B.C." Historia 14 (1965) 423-442.
 "The Surnames and the alleged affinity of C. Caelius Rufus." Eos 56 (1966) 146-150.
 "Were Pompey and Crassus elected in absence to their first consulship?" In Mélanges offerts à Kazimierz Michałowski. (Warszawa 1966) 523-526.
 "Der Senat und die Vereine." In Gesellschaft und Recht im griechisch-römischen Altertum. (Berlin 1968) 94-95.
 "Three trials in 54 B.C. Sufenas, Cato, Procilius and Cicero, Ad Atticum 4, 15, 4." In Studi in onore di Edoardo Volterra, 2. (Milano 1971) 281-302.
 "Roemischer Staat und die Goetterzeichen: zum Problem der obnuntiatio." Jahrbuch der Universitaet Düsseldorf 1969-1970 [1971] 309-322.
 "The aedileship of Favonius, Curio the Younger and Cicero's election to the augurate." HSCP 76 (1972) 181-200.
 Kaminska-Linderski, A.: "A. Gabinius A. f. Capito and the first vote in the legislative comitia tributa". ZPE 12 (1973) 247-252.
 "The Mother of Livia Augusta and the Aufidii Lurcones of the Republic." Historia 23 (1974) 463-480.
 "The Quaestorship of Marcus Antonius." Phoenix 28 (1974) 213-223.
 "Libiis or Libens? A note on a new dedication to Liber Pater from Dacia." Latomus 34 (1975) 209-211.
 "Two Quaestorships." CP 70 (1975) 35-38.
 "Legibus praefecti mittebantur (Mommsen and Festus 262, 5, 13 L)." Historia 28 (1979) 247-250.
 "Amianus." ZPE 30 (1978) 158.
 "A Non-Misunderstood Text Concerning Tages." PP 33, fasc. 180 (1978) 195-196.
 "De villa Appio Pulchro falso attributa." PP 34, fasc. 193 (1980 [1981]) 272-273.
 "Exta and Aves: An Emendation in Rufinus, Origenis in Numeros Homilia 17.2." HSCP 85 (1981) 213-215.
 "Patientia fregit. M. Octavius and Ti. Gracchus (Cicero, Brutus 95)." Athenaeum 60 (1982) 244-247.
 "Auspicia et Auguria Romana...Summo Labore Collecta: A Note on Minucius Felix, Octavius 26.1." CP 77 (1982) 148-150.
 "Natalis Patavii." ZPE 50 (1983) 227-232.
 "A Witticism of Appuleius Saturninus." Rivista di Filologia 111 (1983 [1984]) 452-459.
 "Rome, Aphrodisias and the Res gestae". The genera militiae and the status of Octavian." JRS 74 (1984) 74-80.
 "Usu, farre, coemptione. Bemerkungen zur Ueberlieferung eines Rechtsatzes." ZSS-Roem. Abt. 101 (1984) 301-311.
 "Si vis pacem, para bellum. Concepts of defensive imperialism." In The imperialism of Mid-Republican Rome. The proceedings of a conference held at the American Academy in Rome, November 5–6, 1982. (Rome 1984) 133-164.
 "Buying the vote. Electoral corruption in the late republic." AncWorld 11 (1985) 87-94.
 "The dramatic date of Varro, De re rustica, book III and the elections in 54." Historia 34 (1985) 248-254.
 "The Libri Reconditi." HSCP 89 (1985) 207-234.
 "The Augural Law." ANRW II 16.3:2146-2312 (1986).
 "Religious aspects of the conflict of the orders. The case of "confarreatio". - in: Social struggles in archaic Rome. New perspectives on the conflict of the orders. (Berkeley 1986) 244-261.
 "The aediles and the didascaliae." AncHistB 1 (1987) 83-88.
 "Fumum vendere and fumo necare." Glotta 65 (1987) 137-146.
 "Fumo necare: An Addendum." Glotta 65 (1987) 250-251.
 "Sannio and Remus." Mnemosyne 42 (1989) 90-93.
 "Vergil and Dionysius." Vergilius 38 (1992) 3-11.
 "Two Cruces in Seneca, De vita beata 25.2." AJP 103 (1982) 89-95.
 "A Missing Ponticus." AJAH 12 (1987)[1995] 148-166.
 "Partus ancillae. A vetus quaestio in the light of a new inscription." Labeo 33 (1987) 192-198.
 "Julia in Regium." ZPE 72 (1988) 181-200.
 "Garden parlors. Nobles and birds". - in: Studia Pompeiana et classica in honor of Wilhelmina F. Jashemski, 2. Classica. (New Rochelle 1989) 105-127.
 "Heliogabalus, Alexander Severus and the Ius confarreationis. A note on the "Historia Augusta"". - in: Historia testis. Mélanges d'épigraphie, d'histoire ancienne et de philologie offerts à Tadeusz Zawadzki. (Fribourg 1989) 207-215.
 "The auspices and the struggle of the orders. - in: Staat und Staatlichkeit in der frühen römischen Republik. Akten eines Symposiums, 12. - 15. Juli 1988, Freie Universität Berlin. (Stuttgart 1990) 34-48.
 "Certis calendis." - Epigraphica 52 (1990) 85-96.
 "The death of Pontia." - RhM 133 (1990) 86-93.
 "Mommsen and Syme. Law and power in the principate of Augustus." - in: Between republic and empire. Interpretations of Augustus and his principate. (Berkeley 1990) 42-53.
 "Roman officers in the year of Pydna. - AJPh 111 (1990) 53-71.
 "The surname of M. Antonius Creticus and the cognomina ex victis gentibus." - ZPE 80 (1990) 157-164.
 "Aes olet. Petronius 50, 7 and Martial 9, 59, 11." HSCP 94 (1992) 349-353.
 "Games in Patavium. - Ktema 17 (1992)[1996] 55-76.
 "Ambassadors go to Rome". - in: Les relations internationales. Actes du colloque de Strasbourg, 15 - 17 juin 1993. (Paris 1995) 453-478.
 "Thomas Robert Shannon Broughton." Gnomon 67 (1995) 91-93.
 "Roman Religion in Livy." Livius. Aspekte seines Werkes (Ed. Wolfgang Schuller [Konstanz, 1993]) 53-70.
 "Cato maior in Aetolia." In Transitions to empire. Essays in Greco-Roman history, 360 - 146 B.C., in honor of E. Badian. (Norman Okla. 1996) 376-408.
 "Q. Scipio imperator." In Imperium sine fine. T. Robert S. Broughton and the Roman republic. (Stuttgart 1996) 145-185.
 "Agnes Kirsopp Michels and the religio." CJ 92 (1996–97) 323-345, Taf.
 "Finis porcelli". RCulClMedioev 39 (1997) 105-107.
 "Transitus. Official travel under the sign of "obelus". Philologus 143 (1999) 288-299.
 "Banqueting." Arctos 34 (2000) 101-107.
 "Iuppiter Dolichenus, Hercules and Volcanus in Balaclava." Historia 49 (2000) 128-129.
 "Imago hortorum. Pliny the Elder and the gardens of the urban poor." ClPhil 96 (2001) 305-308.
 "Silver and gold of valor. The award of "armillae" and "torques"." Latomus 60 (2001) 3-15.
 "Isto vilius, immo carum". Anecdotes about king Romulus. AJPh 123 (2002) 587-599.
 "De Tito templum Veneris Paphiae visente, sive de hostiis vovendis et deligendis." Hermes 130 (2002) 507-510.
 "Caelum arsit" and "osidione liberare". Latin idiom and the exploits of the Eighth Augustan Legion at the time of Commodus." ZPE 142 (2003) 241-255.
 "The Menander Inscription from Pompeii and the Expression primus scripsit." ZPE 159 (2007) 45-55.
 "Ink and Blood: Ernst Badian, Rome and the Art of History." in The Legacy Of Ernst Badian, edited by Carol Thomas. Association of Ancient Historians (2013). .

Reviews
Reden und Schweigen: roemische Religion bei Plinius Maior." CP 70 (1975) 284-289.
 "L'ordre equestre a l' epoque republicaine (312-43 av. J.-C.). Tome 2: Prosopographie des chevaliers romains." CP 72 (1977) 55-60.
 "Two Studies in Roman Nomenclature." Phoenix 31 (1977 [1978]) 372-375. 
 "Cicero Imperator. Studies in Cicero's Correspondence 51-47 B.C." Gnomon 52 (1980) 782-785.
 "Iscrizioni lapidarie latine del Museo nazionale concordiese di Portogruaro, I secolo a.C. - III secolo d.C." ANews 10 (1981) 99-100.
 "Cicero and Roman divination." - PP 37 (1982) 12-38.
 "The Roman Republic." CP 77 (1982) 174-178.
 "Cicero, The Ascending Years." CJ77 (1982) 275-277.
 "Le delit religieux dans la cite antique." CP 79 (1984) 174-177.
 "La gladiature en Occident des origines à la mort de Domitien." ClPhil 80 (1985) 189-192.
 "Philosophe et augure. Recherches sur la théorie cicéronienne de la divination." ClPhil 81 (1986) 330-340.
 "Templum." ClPhil 81 (1986) 330-340.
 "Untersuchungen zur Religion und zur Religionspolitik des Kaisers Elagabal." JRS 80 (1990) 235.
 "Les cultes orientaux dans le monde romain." JRS 80 (1990) 235-236.
 "The bronze liver of Piacenza. Analysis of a polytheistic structure." ClPhil 85 (1990) 67-71, Abb.
 "Fratres Arvales. Storia di un collegio sacerdotale romano." CP 86 (1991) 84-87.
 "Jews and god-fearers at Aphrodisias. Greek inscriptions with commentary." Gnomon 63 (1991) 559-561.
 "Lucio Giunio Bruto. Ricerche di storia, religione e diritto sulle origini della repubblica romana." AJPh 112 (1991) 407-409.
 "Iscrizioni lapidarie latine del Museo nazionale concordiese di Portogruaro, I secolo a.C. - III secolo d.C." ANews 16 (1991) 108-109.
 "Römische Geburtsriten." AJPh 113 (1992) 303-304.
 "Prophecy and History in the Crisis of the Roman Empire: A Historical Commentary on the Thirteenth Sibylline Oracle." CP 88 (1993) 180-183.
 "Roman marriage. Iusti coniuges from the time of Cicero to the time of Ulpian." AJPh 116 (1995) 154-156.
 "Volcanus. Recherches comparatistes sur les origines du culte de Vulcain." AJPh 118 (1997) 644-647.
 "Supplementa Italica. Nuova serie, 4." JRA 11 (1998) 459-470.
 "Supplementa Italica. Nuova serie, 5." JRA 11 (1998) 470-474.
 "Religions of Rome." JRA 13 (2000) 453-463.
 "Per la storia romana della provincia di Pesaro e Urbino." JRA 15 (2002) 577-581.
 "Fonti letterarie ed epigrafiche per la storia romana della provincia di Pesaro e Urbino." JRA 15 (2002) 577-581.
 "L'Etruria dei Romani. Opere pubbliche e donazioni private in età imperiale." JRA 16 (2003) 495-499.
 "Theodori Mommseni epistulae ad familiares Italicos." Review of M. Buonocore, Theodor Mommsen e gli studi sul mondo antico. Dalle sue lettere. JRA 19 (2006) 739-745.
 "Indo-European Sacred Space: Vedic and Roman Cult." AJPh 129.1 (2008) 125-128.
 "The Regional Diversification of Latin: 200 BC-AD 600." AJPh 130.3 (2009) 468-73.
  "Les Prénoms de l'Italie antique. Journée d'études, Lyon, 26 janvier 2004" The Classical Review (New Series) 60 (2010) 108-110.
 "Natale Rampazzo: Quasi praetor non fuerit. Studi sulle elezioni magistratuali in Roma repubblicana tra regola ed eccezione." Gnomon 83.6 (2011) 512-515.

Students

Ph.D. students
Konrad, Christoph Frederick. 1985. A HISTORICAL COMMENTARY ON PLUTARCH'S LIFE OF SERTORIUS. Ph.D. Diss. The University of North Carolina at Chapel Hill, ProQuest, UMI Dissertations Publishing.
Hickson, Frances Vincent. 1986. VOCES PRECATIONUM: THE LANGUAGE OF PRAYER IN THE "HISTORY" OF LIVY AND THE "AENEID" OF VERGIL. Ph.D. Diss. The University of North Carolina at Chapel Hill, ProQuest, UMI Dissertations Publishing.
Moore, Timothy Joseph . 1986. Roman Virtues in Livy. Ph.D. Diss. The University of North Carolina at Chapel Hill, ProQuest, UMI Dissertations Publishing.
Royden, Halsey Lawrence. 1986. The Magistrates of the Roman Professional Collegia in Italy from the first to the third century A.D. Ph.D. Diss. The University of North Carolina at Chapel Hill, ProQuest, UMI Dissertations Publishing.
Nicholson, John Harman. 1991. Cicero's 'Actio gratiarum': The orations "Post reditum in senatu" and "Ad quirites". Ph.D. Diss. The University of North Carolina at Chapel Hill, ProQuest, UMI Dissertations Publishing.
Thurmond, David Lawrence. 1992. Felicitas: Public rites of human fecundity in ancient Rome. Ph.D. Diss. The University of North Carolina at Chapel Hill, ProQuest, UMI Dissertations Publishing.
Lorsch, Robin Stacey. 1993. Omina imperii: The omens of power received by the Roman emperors from Augustus to Domitian, their religious interpretation and political influence. Ph.D. Diss. The University of North Carolina at Chapel Hill, ProQuest, UMI Dissertations Publishing.
Mueller, Hans-Friedrich Otto. 1994. Exempla tuenda: Religion, virtue, and politics in Valerius Maximus. Ph.D. Diss. The University of North Carolina at Chapel Hill, ProQuest, UMI Dissertations Publishing.
Seavey, William D. 1994. Ius belli: Roman ideology and the rights of war. Ph.D. Diss. The University of North Carolina at Chapel Hill, ProQuest, UMI Dissertations Publishing.
McDonough, Christopher Michael. 1996. Liminal animals in Roman religion and folklore. Ph.D. Diss. The University of North Carolina at Chapel Hill, ProQuest, UMI Dissertations Publishing.
Abbot, James C, Jr. 1997. Roman deceit: Dolus in Latin literature and Roman society. Ph.D. Diss. The University of North Carolina at Chapel Hill, ProQuest, UMI Dissertations Publishing.
Mazurek, Tadeusz R. 1997. Legal terminology in Horace's "Satires". Ph.D. Diss. The University of North Carolina at Chapel Hill, ProQuest, UMI Dissertations Publishing.
Bernardo, Yvonne Lindjo. 2000. Severitas: A study of a Roman virtue in Cicero. Ph.D. Diss. The University of North Carolina at Chapel Hill, ProQuest, UMI Dissertations Publishing.
Clapp, Douglas C. 2000. The image of the tribunate in Livy. Ph.D. Diss. The University of North Carolina at Chapel Hill, ProQuest, UMI Dissertations Publishing.
Holland, Lora Louise. 2002.  Worshiping Diana: The cult of a Roman goddess in Republican Italy. Ph.D. Diss. The University of North Carolina at Chapel Hill, ProQuest, UMI Dissertations Publishing.
Clark, Jonathan Kenneth. 2003.  Pagan religions in the works of Jerome. Ph.D. Diss. The University of North Carolina at Chapel Hill, ProQuest, UMI Dissertations Publishing.
Muse, Kevin Brian. 2003.  Worthless wastrels: Prodigals and prodigality in classical antiquity. Ph.D. Diss. The University of North Carolina at Chapel Hill, ProQuest, UMI Dissertations Publishing.
Fiscelli, Kathryn Ann. 2004. Plants of life and death: An examination of three plants associated with the cult of the dead. Ph.D. Diss. The University of North Carolina at Chapel Hill, ProQuest, UMI Dissertations Publishing.

M.A. Students
Oaks, Laura S. 1981. Some Aspects of Caesarian Composition: A Computer-Assisted Survey of Style. M.A. thesis, The University of North Carolina at Chapel Hill.
Hahn, Frances Vincent Hickson. 1982. Augusti reditus. M.A. thesis, The University of North Carolina at Chapel Hill.
Rauk, John Neil. 1982. Cicero on the Site of Rome, De re publica 2. 3-11. M.A. thesis, The University of North Carolina at Chapel Hill.
Frauenfelder, David William. 1988. Fides Italica: Livy's View of Italian Allies in the Third Decade of the Ab urbe condita. M.A. thesis, The University of North Carolina at Chapel Hill.
Walker, Andrew David. 1988. Oratio censoria in Republican Rome. M.A. thesis, The University of North Carolina at Chapel Hill.
McDonough, Christopher Michael. 1990. Hercules of the Ara Maxima: A Study in Roman Religion and Cult. M.A. thesis, The University of North Carolina at Chapel Hill.
Bernardo, Yvonne L. 1992. Et careant loliis occulos vitiantibus agri. M.A. thesis, The University of North Carolina at Chapel Hill.
Lund, Brian Zachary. 1995. Women and Inheritance in Pliny's Epistulae. M.A. thesis, The University of North Carolina at Chapel Hill.
Roudenbush, Jeffrey A. 1995.  Servilia and Roman Politics Through 44 BC. M.A. thesis, The University of North Carolina at Chapel Hill.
Coulam, Andrew Craig. 1997. Male Pudicitia: Conceptions of Sexual Virtue for Men in Roman Republican Literature. M.A. thesis, The University of North Carolina at Chapel Hill.
Buszard, Brad B. 1998. Vota and the Methods of Livy. M.A. thesis, The University of North Carolina at Chapel Hill.
Muse, Kevin Brian. 2000. The prodigal in Roman law. M.A. thesis, The University of North Carolina at Chapel Hill.
Johnson, Michael Joseph. 2002. The negative connotation of miscere in Latin prose''. M.A. thesis, The University of North Carolina at Chapel Hill.

References

Polish classical scholars
20th-century Polish historians
Polish male non-fiction writers
Jagiellonian University alumni
University of Oregon faculty
1934 births
Living people
Latin epigraphers
Classical scholars of the University of North Carolina at Chapel Hill